Marshallia graminifolia is a perennial herb species, endemic to the coastal plains of the Southern United States, where it often grows in bogs and in sunny locations. Like all species in the genus Marshallia, it has the common name Barbara's buttons, and is specifically known as grassleaf Barbara's buttons.

M. graminifolia has two accepted subspecies, M. graminifolia subsp. graminifolia, and M. graminifolia subsp. tenuifolia (commonly known as narrowleaf Barbara's buttons or slim leaf Barbara's buttons).

M. graminifolia subsp. tenuifolia grows in moist sandy habitats, such as bogs, wet savannahs and low pine woods in the south-east coastal areas of the United States, from the south coast of Georgia along the gulf coast into east Texas. It has a deep taproot, lavender to white flowers and an achene fruit. The disc shaped flowers are fragrant.

References

Helenieae
Endemic flora of the United States
Flora of Alabama
Flora of Florida
Flora of Georgia (U.S. state)
Threatened flora of the United States
Flora without expected TNC conservation status